Missiology: An International Review is a quarterly peer-reviewed academic journal in the field of missiology. It is the official journal of the American Society of Missiology, and is published by SAGE Publications. Missiology was established in 1973. The editor is Richard L. Starcher (Biola University).

References

External links
 

Christianity studies journals
Quarterly journals
Publications established in 1973
Christian missions
SAGE Publishing academic journals
Missiology